Daniel Celentano (1902–1980) was an American Scene artist who made realistic paintings of everyday life in New York, particularly within the Italian neighborhood of East Harlem where he lived. During the Great Depression he painted murals in the same style for the Section of Painting and Sculpture and the Federal Art Project.

Art training

The son of Italian immigrants, Daniel Celentano was born into a large family within an Italian neighborhood of Manhattan.  A childhood polio attack left him with only partial use of his right leg. Made homebound by this disability he was unable to attend school and, recognizing his artistic skill while he was still a boy, his parents were able to arrange for art teachers to tutor him at home. Through hard work and perseverance he regained control over his leg by the age of twelve and at that time became the first pupil of the social realist painter Thomas Hart Benton.

In 1918 he won scholarships that enabled him to attend Charles Hawthorne's Cape Cod School of Art in Provincetown, Massachusetts, New York School of Fine And Applied Art in Greenwich Village, and the National Academy of Design in New York's Upper East Side. The Cape Cod School taught students during the summer months and the other two gave classes during the rest of the year.

Artistic career

During the 1930s and until the outbreak of World War II  Celentano participated in group shows at galleries in New York, Detroit, Philadelphia, and other American cities. His work was first shown to the public in an exhibition of works selected by Alfred Stieglitz that was held at the Opportunity Gallery in 1930. In his review of this show, the art critic for The New York Times, Edward Alden Jewell, included a painting of Celentano's called "Funeral" among ones that he especially recommended. Celentano's drawing, "Supper Hour," is an early work that is typical in subject and treatment of much that he produced later in his career. It shows a family of eight in a kitchen getting ready to share an evening meal together. From their attitudes and actions it appears that they spend much of their home life in this one room. Although crowded together, they appear to be relaxed and self-assured. His painting, "Festival," of a few years later, shows the boisterous community of East Harlem in holiday mode. The Smithsonian's exhibition label says, "This painting fairly bursts with the raucous sounds, pungent smells, and vibrant characters of Manhattan's ethnic street life."

Between 1935 and 1939 Celentano exhibited regularly at the Walker Gallery. In 1939 his first, and apparently his only one-man show took place there. Of this show a critic for the New York Sun said "He paints the humble domestic life that he knows with a frankness as to its happenings, a sympathy and a tireless eye for detail that command respect, if not enthusiasm. The curious may learn all about that life from his paintings without going to the trouble of doing settlement work or running the slightest risk of getting out of their class." His shows at the Walker Gallery produced institutional sales to the Carnegie Institute, the Art Institute of Chicago, and the Whitney Museum.

Between 1935 and the outbreak of World War II Celentano participated in group exhibitions held in museums and public collections in New York and other major cities, including the Brooklyn Museum, the Corcoran Gallery of Art, the Art Institute of Chicago, the Detroit Institute of Arts, the Syracuse Museum of Fine Arts, the Pennsylvania Academy, the Whitney Museum, and the Golden Gate International Exposition.

From 1934 to 1941 Celentano was employed as a mural painter in New Deal art projects. For the Federal Art Project, he helped William C. Palmer paint murals for the new Queens General Hospital in Jamaica. In 1936 he painted a mural called Commerce for the Flushing branch of the Queens Borough Public Library. A critic for The New York Times pointed out this mural's "realistic illustrational" style noting that it depicted "rural fields and the Manhattan skyline, with crowds of dock loaders and businessmen flanking the central image of an artist (possibly Celentano himself) sitting at a drafting table, a worker among workers." In 1938, commissioned by the Treasury Department's Section of Painting and Sculpture, he created a mural titled The Country Store and Post Office for the post office in Vidalia, Georgia. He also made murals for two high schools, Andrew Jackson (1940) and St. Albans (1941), both in Queens. In 1940 he painted a large mural called Children in Constructive Recreation and Cultural Activity in Public School 150 (Long Island City, Queens). After the United States entered World War II he took a job in the art department of the Grumman Aircraft Corporation in Bethpage, Long Island, where he made a mural called The Flight of Man.

Parents and immediate family

Both of his parents had been born in Italy: his father, Vito, about 1879, and his mother, Maria, about 1880. Celentano was the second of their eleven children who survived infancy. During the years when Celentano was studying art and for much of the rest of his life, he and his family lived on Pleasant Avenue in East Harlem. He was schooled at home until, as a teenager, he overcame the atrophy of his right leg. In 1928 he married Marie Steneck. In 1930, Celentano's wife gave birth to a daughter.

Celentano married a second time to Margaret Mary Dwyer on June 24, 1945, in Astoria, Queens.  Their son Daniel Michael Celentano was born in November 1946. Celentano and his wife eventually moved to St. James, Long Island, where he died of cancer in 1980.

Other names

Celentano was known as Daniel R. Celentano and Daniel Ralph Celentano as well as Daniel Celentano.

Notes

References

Painters from New York City
20th-century American painters
American male painters
Modern painters
1902 births
1980 deaths
Section of Painting and Sculpture artists
Federal Art Project artists
Public Works of Art Project artists
People from East Harlem
People from St. James, New York
20th-century American male artists